German submarine U-883 was a Type IXD/42 U-boat of Nazi Germany's Kriegsmarine in World War II.

Designed in 1942, U-883 was the only commissioned Type IXD/42 submarine, similar to the Type IXD submarine, but with increased engine power (increased from 4400 to 5400 ehp).

Commissioned on 27 March 1945, only weeks before the German capitulation, U-883 was surrendered at Cuxhaven on 5 May 1945. She was sunk on 31 December 1945 as part of Operation Deadlight.

Design
German Type IXD42 submarines were considerably larger than the original Type IXs. U-883 had a displacement of  when at the surface and  while submerged. She had two shafts and two  propellers.

U-883 was fitted with six  torpedo tubes (four fitted at the bow and two at the stern), 24 torpedoes, one  SK C/32 naval gun, 150 rounds, and a  Flak M42 with 2575 rounds as well as two twin  C/30 anti-aircraft guns with 8100 rounds. The boat had a complement of fifty-five.

References

Bibliography

External links
 
 

German Type IX submarines
World War II submarines of Germany
U-boats commissioned in 1945
U-boats sunk in 1945
Operation Deadlight
1944 ships
Ships built in Bremen (state)
Maritime incidents in December 1945